The Gailtal Alps ( or Drauzug), is a mountain range of the Southern Limestone Alps in Austria. It rises between the River Drava (Drau) and the Gail valley  (in southwestern Carinthia) and through the southern part of East Tyrol. Its western group called "Lienz Dolomites" (Lienzer Dolomiten), is sometimes counted as part of this range and sometimes seen as separate.

Classification
According to the Alpine Club classification of the Eastern Alps (AVE) the Gailtal Alps (No. 56) are subdivided into the Drauzug proper and Lienz Dolomites subgroups, while in common parlance the umbrella term Drauzug conversely applies to the whole Limestone Alps range between the Drava and Gail rivers, including the Gailtal Alps and the Lienz Dolomites. In traditional geography according to Eduard Suess and Leopold Kober, Drauzug or Drau-Save-Zug denoted all Southern Limestone Alps ranges stretching along the Drava River, from the Lienz Dolomites in the west to the Karawanks in the east.

Located south of the broad Drava Valley, the Gailtal Alps orographically count as part of the Southern Limestone Alps. However, they rise north of the Periadriatic Seam an therefore geologically do not rank among the Southern Alps ranges. In regard to their orogenesis, they represent the remnants of the limestone nappes which had been moved northwards across the Central Eastern Alps to form the Northern Limestone Alps.

Despite their name, the Lienz Dolomites are not made up of dolomite, though the steep rugged karst topography resembles the South Alpine Dolomite rock formations. The northern Latschur group with Mt. Goldeck near Spittal an der Drau does not consist of limestone rocks, but is a crystalline basement massif.

Geography 

The 100 km long range, which narrows in the west, stretches between the Gail in the south and the Drava in the north.

Neighbouring ranges 
Based on the AVE classification, the adjacent ranges are:
 To the north: Ankogel Group, Kreuzeck Group and Schober Group of the Hohe Tauern, part of the Central Eastern Alps
 To the northwest: Villgraten Mountains, part of the Hohe Tauern
 To the south: Carnic Alps and Karawanks, part of the Southern Limestone Alps
 To the east: Gurktal Alps, part of the Central Eastern Alps

Subdivisions 
The Gailtal Alps can be divided into five massifs in east–west direction, separated by draws and the Weissensee longitudinal valley:

 Reißkofel Group, between Gailberg and the Kreuzberg Saddle south of Greifenburg (Reißkofel, The Jauken massif,  with the highest peak Torkofel, the Spitzkofel, and Sattelnock)
 Latschur Group, between Weissensee and the Drava bend near Sachsenburg (Latschur)
 The Spitzegel Group, southeast of the Weißensee between Kreuzberg Saddle and the Bleiberg Graben (Spitzegel)
 Dobratsch or Villach Alp, the easternmost foothills of the Gailtal Alps with the Schütt nature reserve.

Literature 
 Hubert Peterka, Willi End: Alpenvereinsführer Lienzer Dolomiten, Bergverlag Rother. Munich, 1984,

References

External links 
 Geological section through the Gailtal Alps
 
 Geolog.Bundesanstalt/RockyAustria: Kalkalpen und Drauzug
 Gailtal Alps at summitpost.org (English)

 
Mountain ranges of the Alps
Mountain ranges of Tyrol (state)
Mountain ranges of Carinthia (state)
Southern Limestone Alps
Geography of East Tyrol